Asura pyropa is a moth of the family Erebidae. It is found on Samoa.

References

pyropa
Moths described in 1935
Moths of Oceania